{{Infobox station
| name        = Itoigawa Station
| native_name = 糸魚川駅
| native_name_lang = ja
| type        = 
| image       = 糸魚川駅 （拡大）.jpg
| alt         = 
| mlanguage   = 
| caption     = Itoigawa Station in December 2013
| other_name  = 
| address     = 1-7-10 Ōmachi, Itoigawa City, Niigata Prefecture 941-0061
| country     = Japan
| coordinates = 
| operator    = 
| line        = 
| platforms   =  1 island + 1 side platforms (Oito Line, Hisui Line)2 side platforms (Shinkansen)
| connections = 
| structure   = 
| code        = 
| status      = Staffed (Midori no Madoguchi)
| opened      = 
| closed      = 
| former      =  
| passengers  = 1,205 daily
| pass_year   = FY2016
| map_type    = Nihonkai Hisui Line#Japan Niigata Prefecture#Japan Kanto Chubu Kansai#Japan
| services    = 

 is a railway station in Itoigawa, Niigata, Japan, operated by West Japan Railway Company (JR West) and the third-sector railway operator Echigo Tokimeki Railway. It is also a freight terminal for the Japan Freight Railway Company.

Lines
Itoigawa Station is served by the JR West high-speed Hokuriku Shinkansen and the local Ōito Line, and is located 213.9 kilometers from Takasaki Station and 318.9 kilometers from Tokyo Station. It is 105.4 kilometers from Matsumoto Station, the terminus of the Ōito Line. For the Echigo Tokimeki Railway Nihonkai Hisui Line, the station is 29.9 kilometers from Tomari Station and 315.0 kilometers from Maibara Station.

Station layout

The local portion of the station has one side platform and one island platform with a cut-out, serving four tracks in total. The Shinkansen portion of the station has two opposed side platforms, located above the local train platforms. The station building is located below the tracks and platforms. The station has a Midori no Madoguchi staffed ticket office.

Platforms

History

The station opened on 16 December 1912. With the privatization of JNR on 1 April 1987, the station came under the control of JR West.

The platforms for the Hokuriku Shinkansen opened for service on 14 March 2015.

From this date, operations of former Hokuriku Main Line services were transferred to the ownership of the third-sector operating company Echigo Tokimeki Railway.

Passenger statistics
In fiscal 2016, the station was used by an average of 1205 passengers daily (boarding passengers only).

Surrounding area
Itoigawa City Hall

See also
 List of railway stations in Japan

References

External links

 Itoigawa Station (JR West official page) 
Echigo Tokimeki Railway HP  

Railway stations in Niigata Prefecture
Stations of West Japan Railway Company
Stations of Japan Freight Railway Company
Railway stations in Toyama Prefecture
Railway stations in Japan opened in 1912
Itoigawa, Niigata